Anders Nielsen may refer to:

 Anders Nielsen (politician) (1862–1914), Danish farmer, editor, politician, and Minister for Agriculture
 Anders Nielsen (badminton) (1967–2010), English badminton player
 Anders Nielsen (footballer, born 1970), Danish footballer who played for a number of Belgian clubs
 Anders Nielsen (footballer, born 1972), Danish footballer who played for a number of Dutch clubs
 Anders Nielsen (footballer, born 1986), Danish footballer
 Anders Peter Nielsen (1867–1950), Danish sport shooter Olympic champion
 Anders Christian Nielsen (1848–1929), real estate speculator in Junction City, Oregon
 Anders Nielsen, chief executive officer of MAN Truck & Bus

See also
 Anders Nilsen (disambiguation)
 Anders Nilsson (disambiguation)